Oua is an islet on the north-east of Nukufetau atoll, Tuvalu, next to Lafanga atoll.

References

Islands of Tuvalu
Pacific islands claimed under the Guano Islands Act
Nukufetau